Villa Crespi is a 19th-century Moorish revival-style rural palace, now a luxury hotel and restaurant, located on Via G. Fava 18, near the shores of Lago D'Orta in the town of Orta San Giulio, Province of Novara, Piedmont, Italy.

History
The Villa, once also called Villa Pia, was commissioned in 1879 by a wealthy cotton merchant, Cristoforo Benigno Crespi, from the architect Angelo Colla. The Villa with its restaurant is located southeast of the town below the Sacro Monte di Orta.

Description
It is notable for its scenic tall minaret-like tower. The interior atrium has a dazzling degree of stucco arabesque decoration.

References

External links

Villa Crespi on Catalogo generale dei Beni Culturali—

Villas in Piedmont
Buildings and structures in Orta San Giulio
Moorish Revival architecture in Italy